Steve McKenzie (born 13 April 1954) is an Australian former professional rugby league footballer who played in the 1980s.  McKenzie played at fullback, and was a part of Parramatta's maiden premiership-winning team in 1981.  The following season, he was demoted by coach Jack Gibson, and resumed playing local rugby league on the New South Wales south coast.

References

1954 births
Living people
Australian rugby league players
Parramatta Eels players
Rugby league fullbacks
Rugby league players from New South Wales